Samuel Bronston Productions was an independent American film production company, founded by Samuel Bronston in 1943.

The company produced several epic films, the most notable of which are, John Paul Jones (1959), King of Kings (1961), El Cid (1961), 55 Days at Peking (1963) and The Fall of the Roman Empire (1964).

The films were made in Spain in the company's newly created studios in Las Rozas, near Madrid.

Due to financial difficulties, the company ceased its business activities in 1964. During the ensuing bankruptcy proceedings, Bronston's answer that the company had once had a bank account in Zurich in response to a question under oath about whether he personally had had a Swiss bank account led to his prosecution for perjury. He was convicted, and the case was ultimately appealed to the U.S. Supreme Court, which ruled in Bronston v. United States that literally truthful, but technically misleading, answers cannot be prosecuted.

List of Samuel Bronston Productions films 

Film production companies of the United States
Samuel Bronston Productions films